Myxoxanthophyll is a carotenoid glycoside pigment present (usually as rhamnosides) in the photosynthetic apparatus of cyanobacteria. It is named after the word "Myxophyceae", a former term for cyanobacteria. As a monocyclic xanthophyll, it has a yellowish color. It is required for normal cell wall structure and thylakoid organization in the cyanobacterium Synechocystis. The pigment is unusual because it is glycosylated on the 2'-OH rather than the 1'-OH position of the molecule. Myxoxanthophyll was first isolated from Oscillatoria rubenscens in 1936.

Synthesis 
The bright red pigment lycopene is the acyclic precursor of all carotenoids in cyanobacteria. In myxoxanthophyll synthesis, lycopene is enzymatically converted to 1-hydroxylycoprene, then to intermediates 1'-hydroxy-y-carotene, plectaniaxanthin, and myxol. Finally, the hydroxyl group in myxol is glycosylated at the 2' position to form myxoxanthophyll.

References

External links

Carotenoid glycosides
Biological pigments
Cyclohexenes